Séverine Beltrame and Laura Thorpe were the defending champions, having won the event in 2012. Beltrame chose not to defend her title; Thorpe partnered up with Stephanie Vogt but lost in the semifinals to fourth seeds Yuliya Beygelzimer and Olga Savchuk.

Beygelzimer and Savchuk won the title, defeating Vera Dushevina and Ana Vrljić in the final, 2–6, 6–4, [10–8].

Seeds

Draw

References 
 Draw

Open Gdf Suez De Biarritz - Doubles